Ambarakaraka is a town and commune in Madagascar. It belongs to the district of Ambilobe, which is a part of Diana Region. According to 2001 commune census the population of Ambarakaraka was 16114.

Only primary schooling is available in town. The majority 90% of the population are farmers, while an additional 7% receives their livelihood from raising livestock. The most important crop is rice, while other important products are coffee, seeds of catechu and pepper.  Services provide employment for 3% of the population.

References and notes 

Populated places in Diana Region